Kennedale High School is a public high school in Kennedale, Texas. The only high school in the Kennedale Independent School District, it serves students in Kennedale and a small part of Arlington. It was rated in 2011 "Recognized" by the Texas Education Agency.

Campus
The 1974 building at 930 Bowman Springs Road in Kennedale became the junior high school campus when the new high school building at 901 Wildcat is the Way opened for the 1998–99 school year.

Extracurricular activities
Activities and student groups at Kennedale High School include Art Club, Anime Club, Business Professionals of America, Choir, Computer Science Society, Friends of Rachel, Key Club, Kindness in Students Spreads, National Honor Society, Spanish National Honor Society, Outdoor Education Society, Spanish Club, Student Council, Thespians, UIL Academics, UIL Speech & Debate, and Yearbook.

Athletics
As of 2014, Kennedale High School competes in the AAAA, or 4A, classification of the University Interscholastic League. The Wildcats, known as the Lady Kats in women's leagues, compete in baseball, basketball, cheerleading, cross country, drill team, football, golf, powerlifting, soccer, softball, tennis, track and field, swimming, and volleyball.

State championship titles
Girls' soccer: 2015, 2016 (4A)
Boys' track : 2014 (3A)
Boys' baseball: 2011 (3A)
Boys' basketball: 2008 (3A)
Girls' track : 2004 (3A), 2021 (4A)
Softball: 1998, 2000 (3A)

State Runner-ups
Football: 2017(4A/D1)

Band
The Kennedale High School Wildcat Band is directed by director of bands Mr. Erol K. Oktay. The KHS Wildcat Band includes a marching band, a jazz band, a varsity wind ensemble, and two sub-varsity wind ensembles.

The KHS Wildcat Marching Band has qualified for every UIL state-wide championship since 2006 and qualified for finals in both 2014 and 2016.

The KHS Varsity Wind Ensemble has qualified as a state finalist in the ATSSB Outstanding Performance Series competition.

Notable alumni
Wes Bautovich, football player
Cedric James, football player
Daniel Millican, screenwriter
Baron Browning, NFL linebacker

References

External links
http://www.edline.net/pages/Kennedale_HS

Public high schools in Tarrant County, Texas
1998 establishments in Texas
Educational institutions established in 1998